Battle of Mecca 1813 also known as the Saudi capture of Mecca happened several days after the Saudi capture of Jeddah during the Ottoman–Saudi War.

Prehistory 
The spread of Wahhabi ideas in the mid 18th centurya resulted in the creation of the first centralized feudal-theocratic Saudi state centered in Ad-Diriyah, which by 1780 had taken control of the entire territory of Jeddah. The Persian Gulf coast (Al-Hasa), Kuwait and Bahrain (1803) and the interior of Oman were successively seized. In 1802y the Wahhabis attacked Kerbela, in 1803y they captured Mecca, in 1804y Medina. By 1806y they had taken control of the entire Hijaz. The expansion of Wahhabism dealt a serious blow to the prestige of the Ottoman sultan as "protector of the holy cities. In addition, the Wahhabis began to obstruct the Hajj pilgrims, attacked caravans and began to pose a definite threat to the economy of the Osman Empire.
Under these circumstances, the Ottoman sultan Mustafa IV, preoccupied mainly with affairs in the European part of the empire, instructed in December 1807a to deal with the threat of Wahhabism by force to his vassal Muhammad Ali Pasha.
September 3 1810a, the Egyptian troops were announced to march into the Hijaz: the sixteen-year-old son of Tusun Bey of Ali Pasha stood at the head of the Egyptian land forces. At the end of 1812a the Egyptian troops went on the offensive, which resulted in the capture of Medina in November 1812, and in January 1813a victory at Jidda. After that, Muhammad Ali's troops approached Mecca.

The course of the battle 
The Saudi army of 1,000 militiamen surrendered almost without a fight to the army of many thousands of Muhammad Ali of Egypt.

Literature 
 Facey, William & Grant, Gllian: Saudi Arabia by the First Photographers . 
 Captain G. S. Froster : 'A trip Across the Peninsula - Rehla Abr Al-Jazeera, (Arabic). Mombai - India, 1866

References 

 Kiselev K. A. Egypt and the Wahhabi State: 'War in the Desert' (1811-1818)

Mecca
Mecca
Mecca
Mecca 1813
History of Mecca
Mecca 1813
1813 in the Ottoman Empire
19th century in Saudi Arabia
Mecca 1813
19th century in Mecca
January 1813 events